Roger Danuarta (born May 20, 1982) is a soap opera actor and singer from Indonesia. Roger is the eldest son of the famous hairdresser Johnny Danuarta.

Danuarta's first appearance on television was in the soap opera Cinta Berkalang Noda. Before this, he was appear as guest star in soap opera Jin dan Jun in 1997. His father encouraged Roger to audition. Johnny enrolled his son into various modeling agencies and production houses. He enrolled Roger in singing lessons with Chossy Pratama.

Since then, Roger has starred in numerous soap operas, including Siapa Takut Jatuh Cinta, Amanda, Yang Muda Yang Bercinta, Cewekku Jutek, Anakku Bukan Anakku, Ada Apa Denganmu (including Alyssa Soebandono and Dude Harlino), Sebatas Impian (including Asty Ananta), Preman Kampus (including Mieke Wijaya, Frans Tumbuan, Niken Octa Erwin Cortez and Zack Lee), Cinta Dalam Maut (including Maya Septha, Andi Otniel, Dananjaya, Daud Radex), and Galang. Pengorbanan Anggun (including Marissa Christina and Hikmal Abrar, produced by (Genta Buana Paramita).

Danuarta released two solo albums. His inaugural album Zhao Yao Shuo Ni (As What You Want) released ahead of Chinese New Year was followed by a spiritually themed album, released ahead of Christmas. On July 14, 2007, Roger joined nine soap opera actors including Nicky Tirta, Ian Arya, Dimas Seto, Dwi Andhika, Kiki Rizky, Rifky Abdullah, Gugun Gondrong, Vicky Nitinegoro and Atoy Herlambang and they released a compilation album. It was titled 10 Male Sinetron Artist: Compilation Album, and released by Chique Mayoise Anggitha of CQ Music Indonesia.

Soap operas

Serial

 Yudh 2014 as Vij singh

Filmography 

 Black Mask 2: City of Masks as billy (2002)
 Go as Richard baji Sangar singh (2007)
 Ada Hantu di Vietnam (2012)
 Munna Michael as (Cameo appearance) (2017)

References 

 Beritanya di Astaga.com
 Profil singkat di Infoartis.com

1982 births
Indonesian male film actors
Living people
Indonesian people of Chinese descent
Converts to Islam from Christianity
Indonesian former Christians
Indonesian Muslims